Dalano Banton (born November 7, 1999) is a Canadian professional basketball player for the Toronto Raptors of the National Basketball Association (NBA). He played college basketball for the Western Kentucky Hilltoppers and the Nebraska Cornhuskers. Banton's selection with the 46th overall pick in the 2021 NBA draft by the Raptors made him the first Canadian player to be drafted by the Canadian franchise.

Early life and high school career
Banton grew up in the Mount Olive area inside the Rexdale neighbourhood of Toronto. He began playing basketball as a kid at the North Kipling Community Centre, the Rexdale Community Hub, and a local parking lot. He also attended camps hosted by former Toronto Raptor DeMar DeRozan in the neighbourhood.

Banton, originally a member of 2019 class, reclassified into 2018. He played for Redemption Christian Academy in Northfield, Massachusetts and MacDuffie School in Granby, Massachusetts.

Recruiting
By the end of his high school career, Banton was a consensus four-star recruit and was ranked in the top 100 recruits nationally in 2018 by Rivals (No. 80) and 247Sports (No. 92). 
On November 14, 2017, Banton chose Western Kentucky over Kansas State, UMass, and Minnesota.

College career
As a freshman, Banton played 31 games at Western Kentucky, averaging 3.4 points, 3.0 rebounds and 2.1 assists per game. Banton made 12 starts and nearly had a triple-double with 13 rebounds, 10 assists and eight points in a career-high 38 minutes in a win over No. 15 Wisconsin. Banton was one of only six players in Division I basketball to have a game with at least eight points, 13 rebounds and 10 assists in 2018–19. He had three double-figure scoring efforts on the season, including a season-high 11 points against both Belmont and Saint Mary's, as he also had six assists and three blocks against the Gaels. On April 10, 2019, Banton announced his intent to transfer from Western Kentucky. On May 1, 2019, Banton announced, via Twitter, his commitment to Nebraska.
Banton sat out the 2019–20 season after transferring from Western Kentucky and honed his skills on the scout team. Banton played during the Huskers' trip to Italy in August of 2019, averaging 5.8 points, 3.5 rebounds, 2.5 assists, and 1.3 steals per game in helping the Huskers post a 4–0 record.

On December 17, 2020, Banton recorded just the second triple-double in Nebraska men’s basketball history with 13 points, 11 rebounds, and 10 assists in Nebraska's 110–64 win over Doane University. He averaged 9.6 points, 5.9 rebounds, and 3.9 assists per game. Following the season, he declared for the 2021 NBA draft while maintaining his college eligibility. However, on July 2 he announced he was remaining in the draft.

Professional career

Toronto Raptors (2021–present) 
Banton was drafted with the 46th overall pick in the 2021 NBA draft by the Toronto Raptors, making him the first ever Canadian to be drafted by the franchise. On August 14, he signed a multi-year contract with the Raptors. Banton chose to wear the number 45 to honour the TTC 45 Kipling bus which regularly served the neighbourhood he grew up in. He made his professional debut on 20 October 2021 in the Raptors' season- and home-opener against the Washington Wizards, and scored his first career points in the NBA with a buzzer-beating three-point field goal at the end of the third quarter. On November 13, 2021, Banton scored a season-high 12 points while adding three rebounds, two assists and a steal in a 127–121 loss to the Detroit Pistons.

On November 24, 2022, Banton scored a career-high 27 points, alongside four rebounds, four assists, three steals and two blocks, in a 115–111 win over the Detroit Pistons.

Career statistics

NBA

Regular season

|-
| style="text-align:left;"| 
| style="text-align:left;"| Toronto
| 64 || 1 || 10.9 || .411 || .255 || .591 || 1.9 || 1.5 || .4 || .2 || 3.2
|- class="sortbottom"
| style="text-align:center;" colspan="2"| Career
| 64 || 1 || 10.9 || .411 || .255 || .591 || 1.9 || 1.5 || .4 || .2 || 3.2

Playoffs

|-
| style="text-align:left;"|2022
| style="text-align:left;"|Toronto
| 4 || 0 || 2.0 || 1.000 || — || .500 || .5 || .3 || .3 || .0 || 1.8
|- class="sortbottom"
| style="text-align:center;" colspan="2"|Career
| 4 || 0 || 2.0 || 1.000 || — || .500 || .5 || .3 || .3 || .0 || 1.8

College

|-
| style="text-align:left;"| 2018–19
| style="text-align:left;"| Western Kentucky
| 31 || 12 || 15.1 || .402 || .216 || .559 || 3.0 || 2.1 || .5 || .5 || 3.4
|-
| style="text-align:left;"| 2019–20
| style="text-align:left;"| Nebraska
| style="text-align:center;" colspan="11"|  Redshirt
|-
| style="text-align:left;"| 2020–21
| style="text-align:left;"| Nebraska
| 27 || 22 || 27.3 || .411 || .247 || .659 || 5.9 || 3.9 || 1.0 || .9 || 9.6
|- class="sortbottom"
| style="text-align:center;" colspan="2"| Career
| 58 || 34 || 20.8 || .408 || .237 || .631 || 4.3 || 2.9 || .7 || .7 || 6.3

References

External links
Nebraska Cornhuskers bio
Western Kentucky Hilltoppers bio

1999 births
Living people
Basketball players from Toronto
Black Canadian basketball players
Canadian expatriate basketball people in the United States
Canadian men's basketball players
Nebraska Cornhuskers men's basketball players
Raptors 905 players
Small forwards
Toronto Raptors draft picks
Toronto Raptors players
Western Kentucky Hilltoppers basketball players